Alexandrovka is a rural locality (a selo) in Shebekinsky District, Belgorod Oblast, Russia. The population was 379 as of 2010. There are 2 streets.

Geography 
Alexandrovka is located 58 km northeast of Shebekino (the district's administrative centre) by road. Petrovka is the nearest rural locality.

References 

Rural localities in Shebekinsky District